This timeline of the presidency of Ferdinand Marcos in the Philippines covers three periods of Philippine history in which Marcos wielded political control. First, it covers the period of Marcos' first two terms—1965 to 1969 and 1969 to 1972—under the 1935 Constitution, as well as the antecedent events which brought Marcos to political power. Second, it covers the period in which Proclamation 1081, which put the entirety of the Philippines under Martial Law, was in force—from September 1972 to January 1981. Lastly, it covers the entirety of the period described as the "Fourth Republic," where the Philippines was governed by the 1973 Marcos Constitution after the formal lifting of Proclamation No. 1081.

The timeline covers many of the events highlighted in narrations of Philippine history since history-writing often has a slant towards political events. However, numerous historical events—especially typhoons and earthquakes—that took place in the Philippines during the Marcos presidency era are excluded from the list, as they are not primarily political in nature and did not highlight the political involvement of the Marcos administration.

First and second terms, and antecedent events (1965–1972 and earlier)

Martial law period (September 1972 – January 1981)

"Fourth Republic" period (January 1981 – February 1986)

See also 
 Timeline of Philippine History

References 

Presidency of Ferdinand Marcos